Uncinia elegans is a species of flowering plants in the family Cyperaceae. It is found in New Zealand and Tasmania.

References

External links 
 

elegans
Flora of New Zealand
Flora of Tasmania
Plants described in 1959